Sweet Surprise is a song by Annie Lennox, Chris & Cosey and Dave Stewart, released in 1985 as a 7-inch through Rough Trade UK Records.

Track listing

UK 7" (#RTT 148) 
 "Sweet Surprise I" - 4:34
 "Sweet Surprise II" - 6:22

Notes 
Recorded on 8-track and 24-track at Eurythmics Studio, DEC Camden Town, London, The Church, Hornsey, London and S47, Norfolk.

References 

1985 singles
Songs written by Annie Lennox
Annie Lennox songs
Songs written by David A. Stewart
1985 songs
Rough Trade Records singles